Dukla is a town in Poland.

Dukla may also refer to:

Geography 
Dukla Pass – mountain pass between Poland and Slovakia
Battle of the Dukla Pass (aka Dukla Offensive) – World War II battle
Dukla Coal Mine – former coal mine in Dolní Suchá, the Czech Republic
 Duklja - Roman province (Dioclea), later Medieval Montenegrin state
 Duklja (city) - Archaeological site near Podgorica, Montenegro

Sports 
Various sports clubs in former Czechoslovakia were named Dukla in memory of  the Battle of the Dukla Pass:

Czech Republic
Dukla Prague – historic football club
FK Dukla Prague – football club
HC Dukla Prague – handball club
HC Dukla Jihlava – ice hockey club
VK Dukla Liberec – volleyball club
Dukla Příbram – former name of football club 1. FK Příbram

Slovakia 
 FK Dukla Banská Bystrica – football club
 HC Dukla Trenčín – ice hockey club
 Dukla Prešov – former name of football club 1. FC Tatran Prešov
 Dukla Trenčín – former name of football club FK AS Trenčín